Villa Muñoz - Retiro is a barrio (neighbourhood or district) of Montevideo, Uruguay.

Location
This barrio borders Aguada and Reducto to the west, La Figurita to the north, La Comercial to the east and Cordón to the south.

Landmarks
Villa Muñoz - Retiro is home to the Reus al Norte, a picturesque and historic housing area. Main streets crossing the barrio are Defensa Str., Hocquard Str, Dr. Juan José de Amézaga, with Arenal Grande being the main shopping venue. Villa Muñoz has a big majority of Jewish inhabitants and is therefore considered "the Jewish barrio of Montevideo".

The former prison for women of Miguelete Street (closed since 1986), the Estrella del Norte, located in the southwestern edge of the barrio, had its west wing restored and transformed into a contemporary art exhibition area, the Espacio de Arte Contemporáneo, which opened to the public in June 2010.

Places of worship
 Parish Church of the Immaculate Heart of Mary, Inca 2040; popularly known as St. Pancras, a popular pilgrimage destination every 12th day of the month (Roman Catholic, Claretians)
 Parish Church of Our Lady of Mercy and St. Jude Taddhaeus, a sanctuary; Juan José de Amézaga 2018 (Roman Catholic)

See also 
Barrios of Montevideo
Reus al Norte

Notes

External links 
 Intendencia de Montevideo / Historia de Villa Muñóz
 Intendencia de Montevideo / Historia del barrio Goes
 Revista Raices / Historia del barrio Reus al Norte (Villa Muñóz)
 Revista Raices /Historia del barrio Goes

Barrios of Montevideo
Jews and Judaism in Montevideo